Stan van Bladeren (born 1 October 1997) is a Dutch professional footballer who plays as a goalkeeper for Danish 1st Division side FC Helsingør.

Career

Club career
Van Bladeren joined the Ajax youth academy from local club Foreholte aged 15. He made his professional debut at Jong Ajax on 6 February 2015 in an Eerste Divisie game against FC Volendam. He played the full game in a 3–4 away win.

On 24 August 2020, van Bladeren joined newly relegated Danish 1st Division club Silkeborg IF after two weeks of trial, signing a deal until June 2022. On 30 May 2022 Silkeborg confirmed, that van Bladeren was leaving the club, as his contract was expiring.

On 1 July 2022 it was confirmed, that van Bladeren had joined fellow league club FC Helsingør on a deal until June 2024.

References

External links
 Profile - Voetbal International 

1997 births
Living people
Dutch footballers
Dutch expatriate footballers
People from Teylingen
Association football goalkeepers
Netherlands youth international footballers
Footballers from South Holland
Jong Ajax players
AFC Ajax players
Silkeborg IF players
FC Helsingør players
Eerste Divisie players
Danish 1st Division players
Expatriate men's footballers in Denmark
Dutch expatriate sportspeople in Denmark